Eduardo Estíguar Hurtado Roa (born 2 December 1969) is an Ecuadorian former footballer who played as a striker. He has the record of being the 3rd all-time leading scorer for the Ecuador national football team with 26 goals in 74 caps. He has played for teams in his home nation as well as Mexico, the United States, Scotland, Switzerland, Chile and Argentina. He was one of the early stars of America's Major League Soccer (MLS) scoring the second most goals in the league's opening season and helping the Los Angeles Galaxy make a run for the playoffs. He was active for nearly 20 years, retiring at age 40 in 2010.

Career
Hurtado, nicknamed El Tanque ("The Tank") for his towering frame and his aggressive playing style (trying to roll over everything in his path), has played for many teams in different countries. His first teams were now defunct Valdez Sporting Club from Milagro and Emelec from Guayaquil, in his native Ecuador. He also had stops in Switzerland, Chile, Mexico, the United States, Argentina, and Scotland. He later returned to Ecuador.

Major League Soccer
Hurtado was one of the early stars of Major League Soccer (MLS). In 1996, the league's first year, he finished second in goals, scoring 21 for the Los Angeles Galaxy. He added three in the playoffs as Galaxy fell short in the MLS Cup final and was named to the MLS Best XI after the season. After only eight goals in 1997, Hurtado was traded to the MetroStars two games into the 1998 season and finished the year with 11 goals and 15 assists (10 and 14 of those for the Metros), plus added a goal in the playoffs.

And then 1999 came. After scoring two goals in the Metro season opener, Hurtado scored just five the rest of the way. Playing for one of the worst teams in league history, he was the epitome of everything wrong with the squad, missing easy sitters and empty nets game after game. El Tanque became known as El Tanque, and the Metros let him go on waivers after the season. The New England Revolution picked him up, but he only lasted three goalless games there before getting his release.

Post-MLS Career
Since his departure from MLS, Hurtado played for Liga Deportiva Universitaria, Argentinos Juniors, and then Hibernian, where he joined international teammate Ulises De La Cruz. Hurtado's spell with Hibernian was an unhappy one, as he was signed by Alex McLeish, who soon left the club to join Rangers. Hurtado was ineffective and was given a free transfer by Bobby Williamson.

He then played for Barcelona S.C., El Nacional, the team of Universidad de Concepción, and Audaz Octubrino from Machala. In 2004, he came back to the United States to play indoor soccer, signing with the Cleveland Force of the MISL in December. However, he couldn't adjust to the indoor game and was released in less than a month, returning to Ecuador to play for Olmedo, in 2006, he played for the 2nd Division club Norte America.

He surprisingly announced that he would transfer to Colombian football to sign for the 1st Division Club Deportivo Pereira. The Recordman said: "I feel like I'm 20 years old, I want to score in Colombia" in an interview with a local TV.

In 2008, he played in San Camilo of the Ecuadorian Second Division.

Finally, he decided to play his final season at 40 years old with the oldest team in Ecuador, Club Sport Patria, in the Second Division.

Honors

Nation
 
 Canada Cup: 1999
 Korea Cup: 1995

References

External links
 

1969 births
Living people
Sportspeople from Esmeraldas, Ecuador
Ecuadorian footballers
Association football forwards
FC St. Gallen players
Colo-Colo footballers
Correcaminos UAT footballers
C.S. Emelec footballers
LA Galaxy players
Barcelona S.C. footballers
L.D.U. Quito footballers
New York Red Bulls players
New England Revolution players
Argentinos Juniors footballers
Hibernian F.C. players
C.D. El Nacional footballers
Universidad de Concepción footballers
C.D. Olmedo footballers
C.D. Técnico Universitario footballers
Deportivo Pereira footballers
Ecuadorian Serie A players
Swiss Super League players
Chilean Primera División players
Liga MX players
Major League Soccer players
Major League Soccer All-Stars
Argentine Primera División players
Scottish Premier League players
Categoría Primera A players
Ecuador international footballers
1993 Copa América players
1995 Copa América players
1997 Copa América players
Ecuadorian expatriate footballers
Ecuadorian expatriate sportspeople in Switzerland
Ecuadorian expatriate sportspeople in Chile
Ecuadorian expatriate sportspeople in Mexico
Ecuadorian expatriate sportspeople in the United States
Ecuadorian expatriate sportspeople in Scotland
Ecuadorian expatriate sportspeople in Argentina
Ecuadorian expatriate sportspeople in Colombia
Expatriate footballers in Switzerland
Expatriate footballers in Chile
Expatriate footballers in Mexico
Expatriate soccer players in the United States
Expatriate footballers in Scotland
Expatriate footballers in Argentina
Expatriate footballers in Colombia